Goertz is a surname. Notable people with the surname include:

Allie Goertz (born 1991), American comedy musician, writer and editor
Dave Goertz (born 1965), Canadian retired professional ice hockey player
Raymond Goertz (1915-1970), American mechanical engineer and an early pioneer in the field of robotics